Kim Seoung-il (Hangul: 김성일; ; born 19 December 1990 in Daegu) is a South Korean short track speed skater.

At the 2009 Winter Universiade, Kim won silver medals behind future Olympic speed skating gold medalist Lee Seung-hoon in the men's 1500 metre and 300 metre events. He added bronze in the 5000 metre relay, combining with Lee Seung-hoon.

Kim earned a silver medal at the 2010 Winter Olympics after skating in the semifinals of the 5000 metre relay.

References

External links
 

1990 births
Living people
South Korean male short track speed skaters
Olympic medalists in short track speed skating
Olympic silver medalists for South Korea
Olympic short track speed skaters of South Korea
Short track speed skaters at the 2010 Winter Olympics
Medalists at the 2010 Winter Olympics
Universiade medalists in short track speed skating
Dankook University alumni
Sportspeople from Daegu
World Short Track Speed Skating Championships medalists
Universiade silver medalists for South Korea
Universiade bronze medalists for South Korea
Competitors at the 2009 Winter Universiade
Competitors at the 2011 Winter Universiade
21st-century South Korean people